

The priest and patron relationship, also written as priest-patron or cho-yon, is the Tibetan political theory that the relationship between Tibet and China referred to a symbiotic link between a spiritual leader and a lay patron, such as the historic relationship between the Dalai Lama and the Qing emperor. They were respectively spiritual teacher and lay patron rather than subject and lord. Chöyön is an abbreviation of two Tibetan words: chöney, "that which is worthy of being given gifts and alms" (for example, a lama or a deity), and yöndag, "he who gives gifts to that which is worthy" (a patron). 

During the 1913 Simla Conference, the 13th Dalai Lama's negotiators cited the priest and patron relationship to explain the lack of any clearly demarcated boundary between Tibet and the rest of China (ie. as a religious benefactor, the Qing did not need to be hedged against). According to this concept, in the case of Yuan rule of Tibet in the 13th and 14th centuries, Tibetan Lamas provided religious instruction; performed rites, divination and astrology, and offered the khan flattering religious titles like "protector of religion" or "religious king"; the khan (Kublai and his successors), in turn, protected and advanced the interests of the "priest" ("lama"). The lamas also made effective regents through whom the Mongols ruled Tibet. However according to Sam van Schaik, this is an oversimplification, and the Mongols ruled Tibet as a colony. The Bureau of Buddhist and Tibetan Affairs and Imperial Preceptor in Khanbaliq were at the top of the Tibetan administration, but due to the great distance from Tibet, they had little direct influence on daily governance. Hence, the highest authority in Tibet was the administrator of the Sakya who deferred to the abbot in religious matters.

Certain interpretations and assertions of historical record on the status of Tibet as an integral part of China or an independent state which purport to be of older origin were actually formulated during the 20th century. This includes the description of a "priest-patron" religious relationship governing Sino-Tibetan relations to the exclusion of concrete political subordination, which Elliot Sperling describes as a "rather recent construction" and unsubstantiated. He writes that the priest and patron relationship has been present in times of political subordination, such as during the Yuan and Qing dynasties, as well as in times which the patrons did not possess political authority in Tibet, such as during periods of the Ming and Qing.

See also 
 Mongol conquest of Tibet
 Sino-Tibetan relations during the Ming dynasty
 Tibetan sovereignty debate

References

Bibliography

Sources 

 

History of Tibet
Tibetan independence movement